Teddie Joe Neeley (born September 20, 1943) is an American singer, actor, musician, composer, and record producer. He is known for portraying the title role in Jesus Christ Superstar (1973), a role for which he was nominated for two Golden Globe Awards and has reprised numerous times.

Neeley considers himself a baritone, and is known for his extremely wide vocal range and rock screams—notably the G above high C (G5) in "Gethsemane (I Only Want to Say)" from Jesus Christ Superstar.

Early life and career
Neeley was born in Ranger, Texas. He signed his first record deal in 1965, at age 22, with Capitol Records. He and his group, The Teddy Neeley Five, recorded an album titled Teddy Neeley. They played the club circuit for years, and their name (on a marquee) appeared in the pilot episode of Dragnet 1967. In 1968, Neeley starred in the Los Angeles productions of Larry Norman's rock musicals Alison and Birthday for Shakespeare, with Norman and Richard Hatch. Then, in 1969, Neeley played the lead role of Claude in both the New York and Los Angeles productions of Hair. He also appeared on the controversial, unaired episode of The Smothers Brothers Comedy Hour that prompted CBS to cancel the series.

Jesus Christ Superstar

Neeley's work with Tom O'Horgan, the director of Hair, led to him being called when O'Horgan was hired to stage Jesus Christ Superstar for Broadway. Neeley originally auditioned for the role of Judas, seeing it as a great opportunity to play a character few understand.

However, when Ben Vereen was chosen for the role, Neeley signed on as chorus and also became the understudy for Jesus Christ. This particular opportunity led to his taking on the title role in the Los Angeles stage version (which played at the Universal Amphitheatre) after receiving a standing ovation during a performance earlier in the tour. Castmate and close friend Carl Anderson was touring also as an understudy for Judas.

After performing the title role in the stage production of Tommy in Los Angeles in 1973, Neeley was led to reprise the title role in the film version of Jesus Christ Superstar, directed by Norman Jewison, alongside Anderson as Judas. In 1974, he received nominations for his performance in the film at the 31st Golden Globe Awards for "Best Actor in a Motion Picture—Musical or Comedy" and "New Star Of The Year—Actor".

Post-JCS: music, television, and theatre

In 1974, fresh from the success of Superstar, Neeley released a solo album, 1974 A.D. (1974), and played the role of Billy Shears in The Beatles' Sgt. Pepper's Lonely Hearts Club Band on the Road in New York. From then on, he was a frequent musical guest star on network variety programs such as The Tonight Show with Johnny Carson, The Smothers Brothers Comedy Hour [as lead singer in The Teddy Neeley Five], Sonny and Cher and A Touch of Gold, and as a guest actor in films such as The Shadow of Chikara (1977) and Hard Country (1981), network dramas during the 1970s and 1980s, such as Starsky and Hutch.

The specter of Superstar continued to loom large over Neeley's career. In the late 1970s, he reprised his performance in the title role for two regional productions in California, both under the auspices of the California Youth Theatre organization. The first reunited him with his Broadway and film co-stars Carl Anderson and Yvonne Elliman (as Judas and Mary Magdalene). 

Among his other credits, Neeley composed music for and appeared in Director Robert Altman's film A Perfect Couple (1979) and performed the music for the TriStar feature film Blame It on the Night, NBC-TV's Highway to Heaven, and The Big Blue Marble for the Children's Television Network. He also wrote music for and starred in Cowboy Jack Street, at the Mark Taper Forum in Los Angeles.

At the same time, Neeley provided his abilities as singer, songwriter, vocal arranger, and producer to albums and to appearances by such artists as Nigel Olsson, Tina Turner, Richard Pryor, Robin Williams, Disco Tex and the Sex-O-Lettes, Ray Charles, Richie Havens, The Kinks, Ben Vereen, Bo Diddley, Keith Carradine, and Meat Loaf. 

He worked with songwriter Michael Rapp, who wrote such hit concept albums as Ulysses: The Greek Suite, The Ring and The Enchanter exclusively for showcasing Neeley's vocal talents. In the late 1970s, he returned to live performance, now with his band, Pacific Coast Highway.

Return to the stage

Twenty years after first playing the role, Neeley gained renewed success in the lead role of Jesus in the 1990s touring company of Jesus Christ Superstar (which once again co-starred Carl Anderson as Judas, and also at various points co-starred Stevie Wonder's former wife Syreeta and Irene Cara of Fame as Mary, and Dennis DeYoung of Styx as Pilate). 

This modernized version of the original production included a day-glo temple scene, and a glass crucifixion cross that elevated above the stage and was lit from within. Originally planned as a three-month tour to celebrate the 20th anniversary of the motion picture, the "A.D. Tour" went on to become the longest running revival in North American theater history. From 1992 to 1997, the hugely successful tour criss-crossed the nation multiple times, allowing Neeley the opportunity to reprise his role over 1,700 times.

In 1999, Neeley reunited with Michael Rapp for a new project, a rock musical entitled Rasputin, a story about the fall of the Romanov dynasty as seen through the eyes of Alexei, heir to the throne and friend to the "mad monk" (a role played by Neeley). 

In addition to playing the title role, he produced a one-night showcase production (in 1999) and concept album (released in 2002) of the show. He followed this up in 2000 by performing the role of Willie Moore in the world premiere of Murder in the First, presented by the Rubicon Theatre Company of California, with whom Neeley maintains a close association. That same year he served as the sound consultant for their production of the Harry Chapin revue Lies and Legends. 

In 2004, Neeley worked with RTC once again, appearing as Lucky in the Rubicon Theatre Company's production of Waiting for Godot, which was the centerpiece of their BeckettFest.

In August 2006, once again under the auspices of the California Youth Theatre group (now renamed YouTHeatre–America or YTA), Neeley was asked to perform the title role in Jesus Christ Superstar live in concert for a one-night-only benefit at the Ricardo Montalbán Theatre in Hollywood, California. Produced and directed by Gary Goddard, this production reunited him with several of his former co-stars from the original Broadway cast and 1973 film (Ben Vereen, Yvonne Elliman, Barry Dennen) and also paired him with current celebrities (Jack Black as Herod and Clint Holmes as Simon). National touring cast member Ethan Wilcox was also a part of the production.

Immediately following the Superstar Benefit in Hollywood, Neeley began headlining another production of Jesus Christ Superstar. It was originally billed by some as his national "farewell" tour, but Neeley disavowed the claim and the tour became known as the new "A.D. Tour". 

The new production was a stripped-down version with staging and set limited to a few risers. The tour was supposed to last through 2007, but audience and critical reception for the show was so great that it was extended into 2010. Carl Anderson, who was originally slated to reprise his role as Judas, died in 2004 of leukemia. Corey Glover, lead singer of the rock band Living Colour, co-starred as Judas early in the tour. Glover left the show to rejoin Living Colour in June 2008, and actor James Delisco took over the Judas role, along with several new cast members for the third (2009) leg of the tour. 

On the fourth and final leg (2009–2010), Judas was played by John Twiford. Several other cast members returned for the fourth leg including Darrel R. Whitney (Caiaphas), Matthew G. Myers (Simon/Judas Understudy), Rasmiyyah Feliciano (Soul Sister/Mary Understudy), Ethan Wilcox (Apostle/Guard) and Adam Scott Campbell (Peter). The tour ended in Boston, Massachusetts, on May 9, 2010.

Current projects: film, stage, and music

In 2012, following successful stage tours, film and television work, Neeley continued his childhood dream of singing in a rock and roll band. He hit the road with "The Little Big Band" and the first stop was a benefit concert for the performing arts program at the high school in Virginia where Carl Anderson began his career. He and his band played selections from Hair, Jesus Christ Superstar, Tommy and Sgt. Pepper, along with original songs. Neeley also told stories of his music, stage and film career, including how he got the role of Jesus of Nazareth. Neeley had a cameo role as a slave tracker in Quentin Tarantino's 2012 Academy Award-winning film Django Unchained. While on location in the swamps of Louisiana, Neeley was inspired for the "Tracker's Chant" which was included in the soundtrack for the film. In 2013, Neeley went back into the recording studio to record his album Workin' For The Words, merging the sounds of the American southwestern plains with the eclectic influences of a wider world. Then later in 2013, came the new digitally re-mastered production of his 1974 A.D. original vinyl album, distributed as a CD called Ted Neeley 1974 A.D. / 2013 A.D.

Later in 2013, in celebration of the 40th Anniversary of the film Jesus Christ Superstar, Ted toured the US screening the new digitally re-mastered DCP print of the film. The screening events included a pre-screening audience Q&A and post-film meet and greet with appearances by all of the principal cast members including Barry Dennen (Pontius Pilate), Yvonne Elliman (Mary Magdalene), Kurt Yaghjian (Annas), Bob Bingham (Caiaphas), Larry Marshall (Simon), Josh Mostel (Herod), and choreographer Rob Iscove, in some cities. Carl Anderson was celebrated at each of the events.

Neeley's EP "Rock Opera" was released in April 2014. "Rock Opera" includes songs from Jesus Christ Superstar and Tommy, along with vocal collaborations with friends and Superstar co-stars, including Yvonne Elliman in their duet "Up Where We Belong", and with the late Carl Anderson, featured in the re-imagined "God's Gift To The World". The EP also includes a live on-stage performance of "Gethsemane". Produced by Frank Munoz (Ace Frehley's Anomaly, Jason Newsted's METAL EP), "Rock Opera" was available on iTunes and his web site.

In the spring of 2014, Neeley was invited to Rome to perform as Jesus in the Peep Arrow Production of Jesus Christ Superstar, directed by Massimo Romeo Piparo. The show also featured popular Italian rock band Negrita on stage during the performances along with a 12-piece orchestra. Negrita's frontman Pau played Pontius Pilate, along with Italian singer Simona Molinari (Mary Magdalene), and actor and lead singer of the Italian band Roke's, Shel Shapiro (Caiaphas). The show ran for a few months in Rome and with a positive response from fans, it went on to tour in Italy through May 2015. During the tour Ted reunited with his film co-stars Yvonne Elliman and Barry Dennen for a one-night performance in the Arena di Verona on October 12, 2014. The show sold out and they added a second show that night. In the summer of 2014, Neeley played the role of "The Publicist" in Darren Lynn Bousman and Terrance Zdunich's film Alleluia! The Devil's Carnival. The film had its world premiere in Hollywood at the Egyptian Theatre August 11, 2015 and will be touring the US with a road show in the fall. Following the JCS Italy tour, Neeley was to continue the in-person anniversary JCS screenings with a tour of the California coast in September 2015. He was then to return to Italy for the next leg of the 2015–2016 Jesus Christ Superstar Tour, which was scheduled to tour Italy and into the Netherlands through February 2016. Some more dates of the tour were added in 2017 (April—Italy—and May—Netherlands).

Discography

Solo albums 
 1966 : Teddy Neeley 
 1973 : 1974 A.D.
 2018 : Rock Opera

Collaborative albums 

 1973: Jesus Christ Superstar (The Original Motion Picture Sound Track Album) 
 1978 : Ulysses: The Greek Suite (A-440 Feat. Ted Neeley & Yvonne Iversen)
 1979: Keepin' 'Em Off the Streets—Performing the Music from the Motion Picture A Perfect Couple

Personal life
Neeley met his wife, Leeyan Granger, during the making of the film Jesus Christ Superstar, in which she can be seen as one of the dancers in Simon Zealotes and King Herod's Song. They have two children, Tessa and Zackariah.

References

External links
Ted Neeley's Official Web Site

1943 births
American male composers
21st-century American composers
Living people
Neverland Express members
People from Ranger, Texas
21st-century American male musicians